KIYX (106.1 FM) is a radio station broadcasting a classic hits format. Licensed to Sageville, Iowa, United States, the station serves the Dubuque, Iowa area.  The station is currently owned by Morgan Murphy Media.

References

External links

Morgan Murphy Media stations
IYX
Classic hits radio stations in the United States
Radio stations established in 1996